Dinara Nailevna Gimatova (born 18 November 1986 in Astrakhan, Russian SFSR, Soviet Union) is an Azerbaijani gymnast of Volga Tatar ethnicity.

Career

Dinara entered to the Olympic Reserve School led by Ludmila Tikhmirova, merited coach of USSR and began training with Nadezhda Kholodkova. In 1996, she became a member of the Russian national junior team. In 1999, Dinara won the Russian Hoops tournament, she was invited by Irina Viner and started training with her coach in Moscow.

She is a 4 time Azerbaijani champion, and a participant of World and European championships and many international tournaments. Dinara took 5th place in team performances at the 2005 Baku World championship and at the Moscow European Championships of the same year. In 2003, she won one silver and two bronze medals at the world cup stage tournament in Baku, a bronze medal on Grand Prix tournament in Tie, in 2004 she became the third for her performance with the clubs at the AGF Cup tournament in Baku, she is also a winner of the all round competition between teams of Russia and Azerbaijan.

Gimatova competed in the 2008 Summer Olympics and placed 11th in qualifying round. She retired in 2009 and went on to coach fellow competitor Aliya Garayeva, who finished 4th in the 2012 London Olympics.

Coaching 
Gimatova is now working as a coach in Moscow, her notable trainees have included :

Aliya Garayeva
Maria Titova

References

External links
 
 
 

1986 births
Living people
Sportspeople from Baku
Sportspeople from Astrakhan
Tatar sportspeople
Volga Tatar people
Tatar people of Russia
Azerbaijani rhythmic gymnasts
Gymnasts at the 2008 Summer Olympics
Olympic gymnasts of Azerbaijan
Azerbaijani people of Tatar descent
Gymnastics in Azerbaijan
Sport in Azerbaijan
Medalists at the Rhythmic Gymnastics World Championships
Medalists at the Rhythmic Gymnastics European Championships